The Federal Reserve Bank of St. Louis Little Rock Branch is a branch of the Federal Reserve Bank of St. Louis established in 1918. The Branch provided check processing operations until 2003, when these services were moved to the Memphis Branch. The branch is responsible for the western 2/3 of the state of Arkansas.

Current Board of Directors
The following people are on the board of directors as of Jan. 1, 2023:

Little Rock Branch Regional Executive
The Little Rock branch is led by Regional Executive Matuschka Briggs, who currently serves on the boards of directors of Mercy Hospital East Communities, Mercy Hospital Patient Experience and Missouri Arts Council Board.

See also

 Federal Reserve Act
 Federal Reserve System
 Federal Reserve Districts
 Federal Reserve Branches
 Federal Reserve Bank of St. Louis
 Federal Reserve Bank of St. Louis Louisville Branch
 Federal Reserve Bank of St. Louis Memphis Branch
 Structure of the Federal Reserve System

References

Federal Reserve branches